Churchill County may refer to:

Churchill County, Queensland, Australia
Churchill County, Nevada, United States
USS Churchill County (LST-583), a United States Navy tank landing ship

See also